N.V. Bekaert S.A. (Euronext Brussels: BEKB) is a global company with headquarters in Belgium, employing 28,000 people worldwide. Its primary business is steel wire transformation and coatings. Operating in 45 countries, Bekaert generated combined sales of €5.1 billion in 2019. In 2015, Bekaert acquired Pirelli's steel cord business and will supply steel cord to Pirelli for years to come. Steel cord provides strength to the rubber car tire. This was the largest acquisition in Bekaert's history, adding approximately 300 million euros per year to consolidated sales.

Organisation

Board
The Board of Directors is the company's supreme decision-making body in all matters other than those, in respect of which decision-making powers are reserved to the General Meeting of Shareholders by law or the articles of association. The Board of Directors delegates its management and operational authority to the Bekaert Group Executive. The main task of the Board is to determine the company's general policy and supervise its activities.

The Board of Directors has 13 members :
Jürgen Tinggren (Chairman of the Board of Directors)
 Oswald Schmid (Chief Executive Officer ad interim)
 Gregory Dalle
 Henriette Fenger Ellekrog
 Charles de Liedekerke 
 Christophe Jacobs van Merlen  
 Hubert Jacobs van Merlen 
Colin P. Smith
Eriikka Söderström
Caroline Storme
 Emilie van de Walle de Ghelcke
 Henri Jean Velge  
 Mei Ye

References

External links
 Official site

Manufacturing companies of Belgium
Companies based in West Flanders
Manufacturing companies established in 1880
Belgian brands
Belgian companies established in 1880
Companies listed on Euronext Brussels